Edu or EDU may refer to:yafet

People 
 Given name or nickname
 Edu (footballer, born 1949), Brazilian footballer named Jonas Eduardo Américo
 Edu (footballer, born 1974), Brazilian footballer named Eduardo Araújo Moreira
 Edu (footballer, born 1976), Brazilian footballer named Eduardo Godinho Felipe
 Edu (footballer, born 1978), Brazilian footballer and football technical director named Eduardo César Daud Gaspar
 Edu (footballer, born 1979), Brazilian footballer named Luís Eduardo Schmidt
 Edu (footballer, born 1981), Brazilian footballer named Eduardo Gonçalves de Oliveira
 Edu (footballer, born January 1983), Brazilian footballer named Eduardo Vieira do Nascimento
 Edu (footballer, born February 1983), Brazilian footballer named Eduardo da Silva Escobar
 Edu (footballer, born 1990), Portuguese footballer named Eduardo Augusto Cameselle Machado
 Edú (footballer, born 1992), Portuguese footballer named Eduardo Marques de Castro Silva
 Edu (footballer, born 1993), Brazilian football forward name Eduardo Nascimento da Silva
 Edu (footballer, born 2000)
 Edu Albácar (born 1979), Spanish footballer
 Edu Alonso (born 1974), Spanish footballer
 Edu Ardanuy (born 1967), Spanish guitarist
 Eduardo Mello Borges (born 1986), Azerbaijani futsal player
 Edu Bedia (born 1989), Spanish footballer
 Edu Caballer (born 1981), Spanish footballer
 Edu Campabadal (born 1993), Spanish footballer
 Edu Coimbra (born 1947), Brazilian footballer
 Edu Cortina (born 1996), Spanish footballer
 Eduardo Delani (born 1981), Brazilian footballer
 Edu Dracena (born 1981), Brazilian footballer
 Edu Espada (born 1981), Spanish footballer
 Edu Expósito (born 1996), Spanish footballer
 Edu da Gaita (1916–1982), Brazilian composer and harmonica player
 Edu García (born 1990), Spanish footballer
 Edu Gil (born 1990), Spanish footballer
 Edu Gueda (born 1998), Brazilian singer
 Edu Lobo (born 1943), Brazilian musician
 Edu Manga (born 1967), Brazilian footballer
 Edu Manzano (born 1955), American-Filipino actor, comedian and politician
 Edu Marangon (born 1963), Brazilian footballer
 Edu Moya (born 1981), Spanish footballer
 Chinedu Obasi (born 1986), Nigerian footballer
 Edu Oriol (born 1986), Spanish footballer
 Edu Pinheiro (born 1997), Portuguese footballer
 Edu Ramos (born 1992), Spanish footballer
 Edu Roldán (born 1977), Spanish footballer
 Edu Sales (born 1977), Brazilian footballer
 Edu Snethlage (1883–1941), Dutch footballer
 Edu Torres (born 1964), Spanish basketball coach
 Edu Vílchez (born 1967), Spanish footballer

 Surname
 A. J. Edu (born 2000), Cypriot-born Filipino college basketball player
 Bonifacio Edu (born 1969), Equatoguinean sprinter
 Eloy Edu (born 1985), Equatoguinean footballer
 Maurice Edu (born 1986), American soccer player
 Shafi Edu (1911–2002), Nigerian businessman

Other uses 
 .edu, an Internet top-level domain for educational institutions
 .edu (second-level domain), used in many countries
 Edu, Kwara, a Local Government Area in Nigeria
 EDU FAA Location identifier for University Airport, Davis, California
 EDU, NYSE symbol for New Oriental, a Chinese Education company
 5-ethynyl-2'-deoxyuridine
 East Delta University, a private university in Bangladesh
 Eidgenössisch-Demokratische Union (Federal Democratic Union of Switzerland), a political party in Switzerland
 Electric distribution utility, an entity engaged in electric power distribution
 Equivalent Dwelling Unit is one single-family residential household. An EDU is the unit of measure by which the user is charged for sewer services.
 Ethiopian Democratic Union
 Ethylene diurea
 European Defence Union, of the European Union's Common Security and Defence Policy
 European Democrat Union
 Andrew Horowitz, released an album under the name edu (stylized in lower-case)

See also
 Eduardo